Anansi Boys is a fantasy novel by English writer Neil Gaiman. In the novel, "Mr. Nancy"—an incarnation of the West African trickster god Anansi—dies, leaving twin sons, who in turn discover one another's existence after being separated as young children. The novel follows their adventures as they explore their common heritage. Although it is not a sequel to Gaiman's previous novel American Gods, the character of Mr. Nancy appears in both books.

Gaiman mentioned author Thorne Smith as a strong influence when writing the book; "In the back of my head, when I was writing it, I had a writer named Thorne Smith", and "...the Thorne Smith approach to books with eruptions of magic into normal lives seemed like a territory that would be worthwhile to explore." In the dedication to the novel, he also "tips his hat" to P. G. Wodehouse, Tex Avery and Zora Neale Hurston.

Anansi Boys was published on 20 September 2005 and was released in paperback on 1 October 2006. The book debuted at number one on The New York Times Best Seller list, and won both the Locus Award and the British Fantasy Society Award in 2006. The audiobook was released in 2005, narrated by Lenny Henry.

Plot

Anansi Boys is the story of Charles "Fat Charlie" Nancy, a timid Londoner devoid of ambition, whose unenthusiastic wedding preparations are disrupted when he learns that his father (Mr. Nancy) has died in Florida. The flamboyant Mr. Nancy, in whose shadow Fat Charlie has always lived, died in a slightly embarrassing manner by suffering a fatal heart attack while singing to a young woman on stage in a karaoke bar before falling from stage and accidentally pulling down the woman's top.

Fat Charlie is forced to take time off from the talent agency where he works and travel to Florida for the funeral. Afterwards, while discussing the disposal of Mr. Nancy's estate, Mrs. Callyanne Higgler, a very old family friend, reveals to Fat Charlie that the late Mr. Nancy was actually an incarnation of the West African spider god, Anansi, hence his name. The reason Charlie had apparently not inherited any divine powers was because they had been passed down to his hitherto unknown brother, who Mrs. Higgler explains could be contacted by simply sending an invitation by talking to a spider. Charlie is skeptical, and on his return to England largely forgets what Mrs. Higgler had told him, until one night when he drunkenly whispers to a spider that it would be nice if his brother stopped by for a visit.

The next morning the suave and well-dressed brother, going under the name of "Spider", visits Charlie and is shocked to learn that their father has died. Spider then magically steps into a picture of their childhood home and Charlie goes off to work, rather puzzled by Spider and his sudden miraculous disappearance.

Spider returns that night, stricken with grief that Anansi had died and that he had been thoughtless enough not to notice. At Spider's recommendation, the two brothers attempt to drown their sorrows and become uproariously drunk on the proverbial trio of wine, women, and song. Although Charlie is not involved in most of the womanising or singing, he is drunk enough to sleep through much of the next day. Spider covers for Charlie's absence from his office at the Grahame Coats Agency by magically disguising himself as Charlie. It is explained that although the two brothers are not identical, Spider is able to use his divine powers to appear to others as Charlie's twin.  While at work, Spider discovers his boss Grahame Coats's long-standing practice of embezzling from his clients and also steals the affection and virginity of Charlie's fiancée, Rosie Noah.

Spider, in the guise of Charlie, reveals his knowledge of the financial improprieties to Grahame Coats during a meeting in which Grahame had planned to fire Charlie and, as a result, Grahame delays firing him. When Grahame meets him next, he gives the real Charlie a large cheque and a holiday from work. With Charlie out of the office, Grahame Coats proceeds to alter the financial records to frame Charlie for the embezzlement. Embittered by the loss of his fiancée, Charlie uses his holiday to return to Florida and requests help from Mrs. Higgler and three of her equally old and eccentric friends to expel Spider. Being themselves unable to banish Spider, they instead send Fat Charlie to "the beginning of the world," an abode of ancient gods similar to his father, each of whom represents a species of animal. There he encounters the fearsome Tiger, the outrageous Hyena, and the ridiculous Monkey, among others. None are willing to help the son of the trickster Anansi, who had embarrassed them all at times in their lives. Finally, Charlie meets Bird Woman, who agrees to trade him her help, symbolised by one of her feathers, in exchange for "Anansi's bloodline".

Meanwhile, in London, a swindled client, Maeve Livingstone, confronts Grahame Coats directly, having learned of the theft of her late husband's royalties. Grahame Coats murders her with a hammer and conceals her body in a hidden closet.

When Charlie returns to England, events begin to escalate. Charlie quarrels and scuffles with Spider, Charlie is taken in for questioning by the police for financial fraud at the Grahame Coats Agency, Spider reveals the truth of his identity to Rosie, who is angered by his treatment of her, birds repeatedly attack Spider, Grahame Coats escapes England for his estate and bank accounts in the fictional Caribbean country of Saint Andrews, and Maeve Livingstone's ghost begins haunting the Grahame Coats Agency building.

Maeve is contacted by her late husband, who advises her to move on to the afterlife, but she refuses in favour of taking vengeance on Grahame Coats. Later, she meets the ghost of Anansi himself, who recounts a story to her. Once, Anansi reveals, the animal god Tiger owned all stories, and as a result, all stories were dark, violent and unhappy. Anansi tricked Tiger into surrendering the ownership of stories to him, forever allowing stories to involve cleverness, skill and often humour rather than strength alone.

After he is attacked by flamingoes, Spider realises that something Charlie did is causing these attacks and that he is in mortal peril. Consequently, Spider magically breaks Charlie out of prison. The two discuss matters in the course of fleeing from birds from around the world, realising that giving away Anansi's bloodline implicates Charlie as well as Spider. Charlie is then returned to prison and is eventually freed. He mentions a hidden room in Coats's office to the police, who find Maeve Livingstone's body there.

Spider is swept away in a storm of birds, after which Bird Woman removes his tongue to prevent his use of magic. The Bird Woman delivers Spider to Tiger, Anansi's longtime enemy, who imprisons him. In spite of his helplessness, Spider manages to form a little spider out of clay, instructing it to go find help in the spider kingdom that Anansi and his descendants command. Despite not being as strong as Tiger, Spider still manages to fend him off for some time while Tiger prolongs killing him, preferring to savour his long hoped-for revenge on Anansi and his brood.

Meanwhile, Rosie and her mother have taken a consolation cruise to the Caribbean, where they unexpectedly meet Grahame Coats, who offers them a tour of his home. The two have not heard of the events in England and thus unsuspectingly walk into a trap at his home where they are locked in his basement.

Charlie goes searching for Callyanne Higgler to help him solve his problems. He looks for her in Florida, but Anansi's old friends tell him that Mrs. Higgler has returned to the Caribbean country of Saint Andrews. These friends reveal to him that it was another old lady, Mrs. Dunwiddy, who was annoyed with the young Fat Charlie and made a spell to separate his good side from his bad side, which then became Spider, separating the one person into two. Fat Charlie finally finds Mrs. Higgler after a long search in Saint Andrews and is sent again, via seance, to the beginning of the world where he forces the Bird Woman to give back Anansi's bloodline in return for her feather. Meanwhile, Spider has managed to survive as an overconfident Tiger continues to prolong devouring him. When Tiger attempts a killing strike, a massive army of spider reinforcements summoned by Spider overwhelm him and force his retreat. At this point, Charlie rescues Spider and gives him back his tongue.

Tiger now takes possession of Grahame Coats's body and uses his bloodlust to manipulate him, intending to get revenge on Spider by killing Rosie and her mother. The possession by Tiger, however, makes Grahame Coats vulnerable to attacks from other spirits and Maeve Livingstone, having found Grahame Coats with the aid of Anansi's ghost, eliminates Coats in the real world and, satisfied, moves on to her afterlife.

Meanwhile, still at the beginning of the world, Charlie, having discovered his power to alter reality by singing a story, recounts the long tale of all that has gone before and humiliates Tiger to the point of retreating to his cave. Spider then collapses the cave entrance, sealing Tiger inside. Charlie weaves this event into his song, reinforcing it with his powers, such that Tiger is securely trapped. Coats, turned into a stoat, remains with Tiger as an unwelcome guest that can be perpetually eaten for eternity.

In the end, Spider marries Rosie and becomes the owner of a restaurant. He is put constantly under pressure by Rosie's mother to have children, but (possibly to annoy her) never does. Charlie begins a successful career as a singer, marries police officer Daisy Day and has a son (Marcus). Old Anansi, resting comfortably in his grave, watches his two sons approvingly as he contemplates resurrecting himself in 20 or 25 years.

Awards and nominations
Anansi Boys won the Locus, Mythopoeic, YALSA ALEX, and British Fantasy Awards in 2006. Despite garnering enough votes for a Hugo nomination, Gaiman declined it.

Adaptations

Radio
In 2005, Mike Walker adapted Anansi Boys into a radio play for the BBC World Service. It stars Lenny Henry as Spider and Fat Charlie, Matt Lucas as Grahame Coats and Tiger, Rudolph Walker as Anansi, Doña Croll as Mrs Noah and the Bird Woman, Tameka Empson as Mrs Higgler, Petra Letang as Rosie, Jocelyn Jee Esien as Daisy, and Ben Crowe as Cabbies and other voices. It was broadcast on 17 November 2007. The original soundtrack was composed by Danish composer in residence Nicolai Abrahamsen. It was directed by Anne Edyvean, who also worked on the Radio 3 adaptation of Gaiman's Signal to Noise in 1996.

Gaiman stated that he was displeased with the BBC radio adaptation, because "budget cutbacks and less broadcasting time for drama [have caused BBC to decide] it would have to be an hour-long adaptation. And bad things happen when novels get cut down to an hour. So despite a really terrific cast and production and as solid a script as could be in the circumstances, I was not happy. It felt like one of those Readers' Digest condensed books".

A new, six-part full-cast radio series was produced in 2017, adapted by Dirk Maggs; it's the fifth of Gaiman's novels Maggs has adapted for radio. It is narrated by Joseph Marcell, and stars Jacob Anderson as Fat Charlie, Nathan Stewart-Jarrett as Spider and Lenny Henry as Anansi, with the rest of the cast including Julian Rhind-Tutt as Grahame Coats and Adjoa Andoh as Bird Woman. It was broadcast on BBC Radio 4 and the BBC iPlayer over six days, beginning on Christmas Day 2017; the first five episodes were 30 minutes each, with a 60-minute finale broadcast on December 30. Gaiman is reportedly very happy with this version, describing it as his favourite of Maggs' adaptations.

Film
Gaiman's displeasure with the first BBC radio adaptation led to a willingness to write the script of an Anansi Boys film. He said that "I normally say no to adapting my own stuff into film. But I wanted an Anansi Boys adaptation I could be proud of, and the radio adaption had left me wanting to go: No, this is what I meant".

Television

In 2014, it was reported a television miniseries of Anansi Boys was being produced by the BBC. It was to be made by Red Production Company with Gaiman as executive producer. Although the miniseries was never made, elements of the abandoned series were instead incorporated into the Starz adaptation of American Gods.

In May 2020, it was reported that a miniseries adaptation was in development by Endor Productions, for Amazon Prime Video.
In July 2021, it was announced that Amazon had given the production a series order consisting of 6 episodes. It would be produced by Amazon Studios, The Black Corporation, Endor Productions, and Red Production Company, with Lenny Henry and Neil Gaiman as writers and executive producers. Delroy Lindo is set to star as Mr. Nancy. Malachi Kirby is also set to star as Fat Charlie and Spider.
Filming of the series commenced in January 2022 in Edinburgh.

Translations
Момчетата на Ананси (Bulgarian), 
Anansiho chlapci (Czech), 
I ragazzi di Anansi (Italian), 
בני אנאנסי (Hebrew)
Os Filhos de Anansi (Portuguese), 
Сыновья Ананси (Russian), 
Chłopaki Anansiego (Polish), 
Băieții lui Anansi (Romanian), 
De bende van Anansi (Dutch), 
Los hijos de Anansi (Spanish), 
Anansi dēli (Latvian), 
Hämähäkkijumala (Finnish)
アナンシの血脈 (Japanese), 
Anansi Boys (German), 
Anansijevi momci (Serbian), 
蜘蛛男孩 (Chinese), 
阿南西之子 (Chinese – Taiwan) 
Anansi fiúk (Hungarian), 
Дітлахи Анансі (Ukrainian),

Cultural references
The character Daisy is so named because her parents own and ride a tandem bicycle. This references  the 1892 song "Daisy Bell (Bicycle Built for Two)".
It is also stated that Daisy's  father teaches computer science. This may be a reference either to the song's use in early speech synthesis or to the scene from the 1968 novel and film 2001: A Space Odyssey in which the HAL 9000 computer sings it during its gradual deactivation.

References

External links

 Excerpt
 Review of Anansi Boys at SFFWorld.com
Neil Gaiman – Anansi Boys interview – Three Monkeys Online Magazine
Review of Anansi Boys at StarlightFading.net
Anansi Boys at Worlds Without End.

Novels by Neil Gaiman
2005 British novels
American fantasy novels
2005 fantasy novels
William Morrow and Company books
Weird fiction novels
British novels adapted into television shows